Steele Island is a snow-covered island,  long from east to west and  wide, rising above the Larsen Ice Shelf off the east coast of Palmer Land, 19 km southeast of Cape Sharbonneau. The steeply-sloping sides of the island are crevassed, but no rock is exposed. It was discovered by members of East Base of the US Antarctic Service (USAS) in 1940, and named for Clarence E. Steele, tractor driver for the East Base.

Islands of Palmer Land